Hakimi is a village and jamoat in Tajikistan. It is located in Nurobod District, one of the Districts of Republican Subordination. The jamoat has a total population of 13,666 (2015). Villages: Aligalabon, Darai Tag, Dukak Kaskon, Kofara, Khumrogh, Layron, Maydoni Seb, Obi Boriki Bolo, Obi Boriki Poyon, Sadoqat, Sarizakob, Saripulak, Safedoron, Siyohgulak, Tagi Kamar, Chorsada, Shohtuti Bolo, Shohtuti Poyon, Hakimii Bolo, Hakimii Poyon, Hakimii Miyona, Hasandara, Javchii Bolo, Javchii Poyon.

References

Populated places in Districts of Republican Subordination
Jamoats of Tajikistan